Glen Huon is a rural residential locality in the local government area of Huon Valley in the South-east region of Tasmania. The 2016 census has a population of 661 for the state suburb of Glen Huon.

History
Glen Huon was gazetted as a locality in 1965.
Upper Huon Post Office opened on 1 August 1907. It was renamed Wybalerma in 1910 and Glen Huon in 1911.

Geography
The Huon River forms the northern boundary.

Road infrastructure
The C619 route (Glen Huon Road) enters from the north-west and runs along the Huon River to the north-east, where it exits.

References

Southern Tasmania
Towns in Tasmania
Localities of Huon Valley Council